Roberto Ángel Salcedo Sanz (born September 22, 1979), better known by his stage name Robertico Salcedo or simply Roberto Salcedo, is a Dominican comedian, actor, screenwriter, producer and writer.

Biography
From an early age he has been in front of cameras, since he was 5 years old he started to appear in comedy shows along with his father Roberto Salcedo Sr.

In addition to conducting and production of this weekly program, Salcedo has assumed other projects such as plays and low budget movies which have had great financial success but have been severely panned by critics.

He has also worked with Fausto Mata in movies like Megadiva, I Love Bachata, Profe por accidente, among others.

Filmography

References

External links

1979 births
Dominican Republic male film actors
Dominican Republic male stage actors
Dominican Republic male television actors
Living people
Dominican Republic people of Spanish descent